Ángel Espinosa Capó (2 October 1966 – 12 April 2017) was a Cuban amateur boxer who dominated the 1980s at junior middleweight and middleweight and captured the 1986 World Amateur Boxing Championships. He never won an Olympic medal due to Cuba's boycott of the 1984 and 1988 Summer Olympics (as well as the 1985 Boxing World Cup boycott.) A hard-hitting Cuban with a southpaw stance one of the most feared in his era was known to have about 300 amateur fights.

Career
In 1983 the hard-hitting southpaw won the junior world championships at junior welterweight by knocking out Meldrick Taylor in round 2. Cuba boycotted the 1984 Olympic Games.

He became 1986 world champion at junior middleweight. Espinosa then added the Panamerican title 1987 at middleweight.

On two occasions when Cuban government boycotted the Boxing World Cup in 1985, and the Summer Olympics in 1988, gold winner in the middleweight class was East German Henry Maske, whom Espinosa defeated three times unanimously in 1987–88.

At the 1989 world championships he defeated Sven Ottke but lost to local hero Andrey Kurnyavka. At Espinosa's first Olympics in Barcelona 1992 he competed at light-heavy and lost to Wojciech Bartnik . Angel trained amateurs in a boxing gym in Hialeah, Fl named "Hialeah School of Boxing" before his passing.

Angel was found dead at a gym in Miami. Cause of death is still undetermined.

References
Record (Archived 2009-10-25)

1966 births
2017 deaths
Middleweight boxers
Southpaw boxers
Pan American Games gold medalists for Cuba
Boxers at the 1987 Pan American Games
Boxers at the 1992 Summer Olympics
Olympic boxers of Cuba
Cuban male boxers
Defecting sportspeople of Cuba
AIBA World Boxing Championships medalists
Pan American Games medalists in boxing
Competitors at the 1986 Central American and Caribbean Games
Central American and Caribbean Games gold medalists for Cuba
Central American and Caribbean Games medalists in boxing
Medalists at the 1987 Pan American Games